Porphyromonas canoris  is a Gram-negative, obligately anaerobic, non-spore-forming and non-motile bacterium from the genus of Porphyromonas which has been isolated from subgingival plaque from dogs.

References

External links
Type strain of Porphyromonas canoris at BacDive -  the Bacterial Diversity Metadatabase

Bacteroidia
Bacteria described in 1994